Bringer may refer to:

 Bringer of light (or lightbringer), a nickname for Lucifer/Satan
 Bringer of Blood, an album by Six Feet Under
 Bringer of Plagues, an album by Divine Heresy
 Bringer of War, an album by Rebaelliun
 Bringers of the First Evil, demons in the Buffy: The Vampire Slayer television series
 Word-Bringer, a supervillain of Superman
 Death Bringer, a computer role-playing game
 Soma Bringer, a role-playing video game
 Fire Bringer, young adult fantasy novel by David Clement-Davies
 Rachel Bringer, politician

See also
 
 
 Lightbringer (disambiguation)
 Bring (disambiguation)